Dafydd Ddu o Hiraddug (died 1371), also known as Dafydd Ddu Athro o Hiraddug, was a Welsh language poet, grammarian, and Roman Catholic priest in the diocese of Llanelwy (St Asaph). He was once believed to be the son of a certain Hywel ap Madog of Tremeirchion, but this has now been disproven.

Dafydd composed poems on religious themes; his surviving work includes poems on the Ten Commandments, Salvation, and on the ephemeracy of human life and of God's judgement to come after death.

Dafydd was probably buried in Dyserth, north Wales.

References

Bibliography
R. Geraint Gruffydd and Rhiannon Ifans (eds.), Gwaith Einion Offeriad a Dafydd Ddu o Hiraddug (Aberystwyth, 1997)

External links
Gwenllian's Poetry Primer: an introduction to the poetic metres of the grammar.

Welsh-language poets
1371 deaths
Year of birth unknown
14th-century Welsh poets